Giuliano Musiello (born 12 January 1954 in Torviscosa) is an Italian former footballer who played as a striker. He played for 4 seasons (100 games, 15 goals) in Serie A for Atalanta, Roma and Verona.

References

1954 births
Living people
Italian footballers
Association football forwards
Serie A players
S.P.A.L. players
Atalanta B.C. players
U.S. Avellino 1912 players
A.S. Roma players
Genoa C.F.C. players
Hellas Verona F.C. players
Calcio Foggia 1920 players
Novara F.C. players
Ravenna F.C. players
A.C. Cuneo 1905 players
Serie B players